Karl Ravech (born ) is an American journalist who works as the primary play by play commentator for Sunday Night Baseball.

Early life and education
Ravech is a native of Needham, Massachusetts. He received a bachelor's degree in communications from Ithaca College in 1987 and a master's degree in management and leadership from Binghamton University in 1990.

Career

Early Work
He worked at WBNG-TV, in Binghamton, N.Y., as a sports anchor/reporter from 1987 to 1990 and then WHTM-TV in Harrisburg, Pa. from 1990-1993 in a similar role.

ESPN
Ravech has worked for ESPN since 1993, appearing primarily on SportsCenter and Baseball Tonight. Since 2006, Ravech has provided commentary for ESPN and ABC's coverage of the Little League World Series in Williamsport, Pennsylvania. He has also done commentary for the College World Series, golf, college basketball, and ESPN's KBO League coverage during 2020. He also appears as the Baseball Tonight host in the 2K Sports video game, Major League Baseball 2K5.

Timeline
1995–2018: Baseball Tonight primary host
1993–2008: SportsCenter anchor
2000–2006: ESPN golf host
College Hoops 2Night host
College Basketball on ABC studio host
2013–present: ESPN Major League Baseball play-by-play
2017–present: College Basketball on ESPN play-by-play
2022–present: Sunday Night Baseball play-by-play

Personal life
Ravech suffered a heart attack in November 1998. Ravech's son Sam, at the age of 22, became the youngest play-by-play broadcaster on ESPN after calling a Tulane men's basketball game on November 22, 2017.

References

Living people
American television sports anchors
Binghamton University alumni
College basketball announcers in the United States
College baseball announcers in the United States
ESPN people
Golf writers and broadcasters
Ithaca College alumni
Journalists from Massachusetts
Major League Baseball broadcasters
People from Avon, Connecticut
Sportspeople from Needham, Massachusetts
State University of New York people
Year of birth missing (living people)